Lingleville Independent School District is a public school district based in the community of Lingleville, Texas (USA).  Located in Erath County, small portions of the district extend into Eastland and Comanche counties.

Lingleville ISD has one school Lingleville School that serves students in grades pre-kindergarten through twelve. In 2009, the school district was rated "recognized" by the Texas Education Agency.

Students

Academics

Students in Lingleville match or outperform local region and statewide averages on standardized tests.  In 2018-2019 State of Texas Assessments of Academic Readiness (STAAR) results, 83% of students in Lingleville ISD met Approaches Grade Level standards, compared with 79% in Region 11 and 78% in the state of Texas. The average SAT score of the students tested in 2017-18 was 1025, and the average ACT score was 20.6.

Demographics
In the 2018–2019 school year, the school district had a total of 279 students, ranging from pre-kindergarten through grade 12. The class of 2018 included 18 graduates; the annual drop-out rate across grades 9-12 was reported as 0.0%.

As of the 2018–2019 school year, the ethnic distribution of the school district was 51.3% Hispanic, 48.0% White, 0.4% African American, 1.6% Asian, 0.7% American Indian, 0.1% Pacific Islander, and 0.4% from two or more races; no American Indian, Asian, or Pacific Islander students were reported. Economically disadvantaged students made up 50.9% of the student body, compared with 60.6% of all Texas students.

Special programs

Athletics
Lingleville High School plays six-man football.

See also

List of school districts in Texas

References

External links
Lingleville ISD

School districts in Erath County, Texas
School districts in Eastland County, Texas
School districts in Comanche County, Texas